The Nucleo Operativo Centrale di Sicurezza (NOCS) is the police tactical unit of the Polizia di Stato, one of Italy's national police forces. It operates under the command of the Direzione Centrale della Polizia di Prevenzione.

History

In 1974 the Chief of the Polizia di Stato Anti-Terrorism Bureau, Emilio Santillo, announced the necessity to establish a tactical unit with the capability to arrest known terrorists and to support the local counter-terrorism field office. Personnel were selected from Police Sports Group "Fiamme Oro ("Gold Flames"), particularly trained in martial arts. The 35-man team was denominated "counter-commando unit" and commanded by Maj. Andrea Sgandurra, an officer with counter-insurgency experiences, and a skilled proponent of hand-to-hand combat skills. After one year of training (offensive driving, sniping, various shooting skills, and a tactical assault course) in 1975 the unit became operational and immediately started mission against the left wing terrorist organization NAP ("Nuclei Armati Proletari", Proletarian Armed Service). Later they operated against the right wing group "New Order", which resulted in the arrests of well-known terrorists Gentile Schiavone and Pierluigi Concutelli. In 1978, the Italian government decided to modify the structure of the Anti-Terrorist Bureau to improve its capabilities. This change resulted in the formation of SISMI (military intelligence), SISDE (civilian intelligence), and a police counter-terrorism agency (Ufficio Centrale per le Investigazioni Generali e le Operazioni Speciali (UCIGOS) also known as the Central Office for General Investigations and Special Operations). This office was the only responsible for Italian counter-terrorism. The UCIGOS's tactical unit became the NOCS (Nucleo Operativo Centrale di Sicurezza, Central Security Operations Service), the old counter-commando unit with far more operatives, training, and responsibilities. During its 22 years of existence, NOCS has performed more than 4,500 missions and 205 arrests. The 25–42 operatives studied terrorist methodology and created innovative tactics procedures. Their motto is Sicut Nox Silentes (As Silent as Night).

In 1982 under the tactical command of Captain Edoardo Perna a 12-man section, without firing a single shot, freed Brigadier General James Dozier, who had been held hostage by Red Brigades terrorists. In the following years NOCS expanded in size and capabilities and under new command, then Major Maurizio Genolini, became a full-fledged counter-terrorism unit, with capabilities of operations on aircraft, trains, buses, embassies, and stadium areas and established good relations with several counter-terrorism units in the western world.

Recently, NOCS has undergone another change and become the Anti-Terrorism Special Operations Division. The unit improved capabilities in C3I and a computer and video section was added. NOCS was innovative regarding the incorporation of computers in training formalizing this with the addition of a separate video section. NOCS also expanded its training in VIP protection and driving, augmented by training with the well-established United States Secret Service. This relationship sparked the creation of a unit similar  in form and function to United States Secret Service counter-terrorism teams as well. VIP protection is not a main mission for NOCS, but they are responsible for this duty when high risk personalities come to Italy.

In 2017, NOCS revealed that a female operator, known as "Marta", become part of the operational unit of the department, one of the first cases in European law enforcement where a woman is recruited in a police-tactical unit.

Structure

Today, SOD/NOCS have three tactical assault teams and one protection division. All operatives have HALO jump training, explosive ordnance disposal training, sniper and combat shooting. Several operatives have scuba diving training as well. SOD has a logistics branch with specialized personnel in support of operatives. NOCS has several specialized vehicles, operated by specially trained drivers. The basic training last six months and is followed by an advance training program lasting an additional six months.

Prospective recruits must have at least four years of service with the PS and be at least 28 years old when they enlist.

Equipment
Glock handguns
Colt Python revolver
Beretta 92FS pistol
Beretta Px4 Storm pistol
Sako TRG sniper rifle
Beretta ARX-160 assault rifle
Heckler & Koch G36C assault rifle
H&K MP5 submachine gun
Socimi Type 821 submachine gun
Heckler & Koch MP7 submachine gun
Franchi SPAS-12 shotgun
HK PSG-1 sniper rifle

References

External links
Official website 

Hostage rescue units
ATLAS Network
Non-military counterterrorist organizations
Police tactical units
Polizia di Stato